The 2000 Dubai World Cup was a horse race held at Nad Al Sheba Racecourse on Saturday 25 March 2000. It was the 5th running of the Dubai World Cup.

The winner was Godolphin's Dubai Millennium, a four-year-old bay colt trained in Dubai by Saeed bin Suroor and ridden by Frankie Dettori. Dubai Millennium's victory was the first in the race for Dettori, a second for bin Suroor and a first for Godolphin.

Dubai Millennium was one of the leading colts of his generation in Europe, winning the Prix Jacques le Marois and the Queen Elizabeth II Stakes in 1999. He made his debut on dirt at Nad Al Sheba on 2 March when he won a round of the Al Maktoum Challenge. In the 2000 Dubai World Cup he took the lead soon after the start and drew clear in the straight to win by six lengths from the American challenger Behrens with a gap of five and a half lengths to Public Purse in third place. The winning time of 1:59.50 was a new track record.

Race details
 Sponsor: none
 Purse: £3,658,537; First prize: £2,195,122
 Surface: Dirt
 Going: Fast
 Distance: 10 furlongs
 Number of runners: 13
 Winner's time: 1:59.50

Full result

 Abbreviations: DSQ = disqualified; nse = nose; nk = neck; shd = head; hd = head; nk = neck

Winner's details
Further details of the winner, Dubai Millennium
 Sex: Stallion
 Foaled: 20 March 1996
 Country: Great Britain
 Sire: Seeking The Gold; Dam: Colorado Dancer (Shareef Dancer)
 Owner: Godolphin
 Breeder: Sheikh Mohammed

References

Dubai World Cup
Dubai World Cup
Dubai World Cup
Dubai World Cup